Mohamed Abdul Wahab Al-Salah (born 10 October 1958) is a Kuwaiti swimmer. He competed in two events at the 1980 Summer Olympics.

References

External links
 

1958 births
Living people
Kuwaiti male swimmers
Olympic swimmers of Kuwait
Swimmers at the 1980 Summer Olympics
Place of birth missing (living people)